Cunningham House is a historic home located at Glens Falls, Warren County, New York, United States. It was built around 1910 and is a two-story, stuccoed residence with a hipped roof clad with wood shingles. It was designed by Boston architect Henry Forbes Bigesby. It was originally built as a studio, but converted to a residential property in 1919. At that time, a two-story service wing was added.  It features a two-story enclosed center court lighted by a skylight.

It was added to the National Register of Historic Places in 1984.

References

Houses on the National Register of Historic Places in New York (state)
Houses completed in 1910
Houses in Warren County, New York
National Register of Historic Places in Warren County, New York